Crimen sin olvido is a 1968 Argentine film directed by Jorge Mistral. It was a joint production with Bolivia.

Cast
 Jorge Mistral
 Graciela Dufau
 Héctor Méndez
 Rosángela Balbo
 Santiago Gómez Cou
 Marcos Zucker

References

External links
 

1968 films
Argentine crime drama films
1960s Spanish-language films
Bolivian drama films
1960s Argentine films